Teno may refer to:
 Teno – a Chilean city and commune
 Teno River – a river located in Chile
 Teno - a river bordering Norway and Finland
 Macizo de Teno, a mountain range on Tenerife, Spain
 Senad Hadžimusić Teno – a Bosnian noise musician
 Melina Teno – a Brazilian water polo player
 Harvey Teno – a professional ice hockey player
 TENO – a former German organisation